John Mark Knight (born 16 March 1958) is an English former cricketer.

Knight was born at Oundle in March 1958. He studied at Worcester College, Oxford. While studying at the University of Oxford, he made his debut in first-class cricket for Oxford University against Somerset at Oxford in 1978. He played first-class cricket for Oxford until 1981, making a total of 23 appearances. He scored a total of 318 runs in these matches, at an average of 9.93 and a high score of 41 not out. With his right-arm fast-medium bowling, he took 32 wickets at a bowling average of 44.50, with best figures of 4 for 69.

In addition to playing first-class cricket, Knight also played List A one-day for the Combined Universities cricket team, making six appearances in the Benson & Hedges Cup between 1978–81. He scored 77 runs in his six matches, with a high score of 54 not out against Northamptonshire in the 1979 Benson & Hedges Cup. He also 2 wickets, though coming at an expensive average of 77.50. He also played minor counties cricket for Wiltshire between 1977–82, making eighteen appearances in the Minor Counties Championship.

References

External links

1958 births
Living people
People from Oundle
Alumni of Worcester College, Oxford
English cricketers
Wiltshire cricketers
Oxford University cricketers
British Universities cricketers